Keansburg is a borough in Monmouth County, in the U.S. state of New Jersey. At the 2020 United States census, its population was 9,755, a drop of 350 from the 2010 census enumeration of 10,105, in turn a decline of 627 (−5.8%) from 10,732 in the 2000 Census.

Keansburg was formed as a borough by an act of the New Jersey Legislature on March 26, 1917, from portions of both Middletown Township and Raritan Township (now Hazlet), based on the results of a referendum held on April 17, 1917.

It is part of the Bayshore Regional Strategic Plan, an effort by nine municipalities in northern Monmouth County to reinvigorate the area's economy by emphasizing its traditional downtowns, dense residential neighborhoods, maritime history, and the natural beauty of the Raritan Bay coastline.

History

The land that is now Keansburg was earlier home to Lenni Lenape Native Americans.

On September 3, 1609, the Half Moon, captained by Henry Hudson, is said to have landed on the shores of present-day Keansburg (although some historians argue that the landing and forthcoming explained events took place at the tip of Sandy Hook). Crewmen of the ship were attacked by the Native Americans when they departed the ship, and John Colman was killed, making him what is said to be the first European to be murdered by a Native American. He is believed to have been buried in the area that is today the intersection of Carr Avenue and Beachway in an area known as "Colman's Point".

In the time between 1609 and the early 18th century, the land was gradually purchased from the Lenni Lenape, together with other surrounding areas. The area was inhabited by Dutch, English, and Scottish settlers. In the 18th century, farming proved to be successful on Keansburg's land, with specialties being pears, apples and corn (maize).

In this time, the settlement took on the name of Waackaack (pronounced "Way-kay-ack"), which came from the term "Wakioak" in the Lenape language meaning "Land of Plenty". The area was also widely known as Tanner's Landing from the early 18th century until approximately 1820, so named for the pier at the end of what was Tanner's Landing Road (now Main Street). Tanner's Landing was a principal port for the area for many years.

The area adopted its second official name of Granville, which derived from the importance of the Phillips Mill, and the grain-producing farms in the region. The name held until the 1880s. During the century, Granville became home to its own church, two lighthouses and small businesses. Roadways were beginning to form from repeated use of horse and buggies. The beach was already a favorite to visitors. Population was about 300 people, who mostly farmed and clammed for a living.

On Sunday, March 22, 1877, at "half past 9 o'clock," Granville welcomed the newly assigned pastor of the Granville Methodist Episcopal Church, William W. Ramsay.  He later stated:  "I arrived at the Granville Methodist Episcopal Church in Keansburg as pastor for the ensuing year.  I soon learned that the hamlet consisted of about 300 inhabitants, whose occupations were mainly devoted to clamming & farming."  At 19 years of age, Ramsay was slated to serve in the church for just one year. His success at the helm of church led to another year in Granville, after which he decided to make the village his permanent home.  Ramsay and his wife, Eliza S. Wood, purchased the land that is 69 Church Street and opened a general store in 1881. In the coming years, Ramsay took greater and greater interest in Granville and eventually arranged a petition to establish a post office. The list of 132 names was passed on to John Kean of Elizabeth, a candidate for Congress. His efforts led to the opening of the post office in 1884, with Mrs. Ramsay serving as its first postmaster.  That year, the name Keansburg was adopted in Kean's honor. A school was built at the cost of $30,000 in 1890 and sat on what is today the corner of Myrtle Avenue and Church Street (now Fallon Manor).

Further development continued with the creation of postcards depicting the village and land purchases, including acquisitions by William A. Gehlhaus and the Keansburg Beach Company. The Keansburg Steamboat Company was founded in 1910 primarily by Gelhaus as a means of providing transportation for New Yorkers who were interested in buying homes in Keansburg.  In 1893, Gelhaus purchased a bakery business in Atlantic Highlands which he operated with his brothers until 1905.  At that time he entered the real estate business in Keansburg. He was president of the New Point Comfort Beach Company which he formed with Jesse Sculthorp and Howard Roberts. The company owned a large real estate development in Keansburg and in 1906 laid out the Beachway.  On June 18, 1909, the New Point Comfort Beach Company bought the steamboat Accomack in Norfolk, Virginia, and started a scheduled run from New York to Keansburg on July 1 that was intended as a way to bring prospective property buyers to Keansburg. Another real estate developer, Keansburg Heights Development Co., bought several thousand tickets. By July 21, more than $1,500 worth of tickets had been sold at $0.35 each. As the town became more populated, the Keansburg Beach Company sold off most of the surrounding land on Beachway Ave., keeping "just the boardwalk and amusement area."

Tourists from New York City would ferry over and spend the weekend or summer vacation to escape the city heat, until Hurricane Donna wiped out much of the waterfront area in 1960. In 1969, the borough spent $7.9 million on the Bayshore Hurricane Protection Plan, which had been developed with state and federal funding from The New Jersey Bureau of Navigation and the United States Army Corps of Engineers.  The redevelopment plan increased the size of the beaches to protect against future storms.  A number of fires in the 1980s destroyed several structures on the North side of Beachway Avenue.  The Dance Hall Auditorium, Keansburg Bowling Alley and the Casino Theater were destroyed by fire during this time.

The Gelhaus family re-acquired the Keansburg Amusement Park in 1995, following a 20-year absence after Henry Gelhaus had sold the property in 1972.  The return of the Gelhaus family as proprietors of the amusement park sparked a resurgence of interest in the town.  Upgrades were made to the amusement park grounds and a water park was constructed.  Runaway rapids was opened in 1996 on the site of the former Crystal Pool. The Keansburg Waterfront Public Library, founded in 2004, was the result of a concerted effort on the part of townspeople and the borough government to provide a high quality library with resources that address the needs and interests of the community. In 2012, the town added a $3 million desalination plant with Federal Stimulus Funds and a low interest loan from the N.J. Environmental Infrastructure Trust, which greatly improved the quality of the water supply.  The town had previously stopped providing well water, as saltwater intrusion into the aquifer had exceeded environmental protection standards.  The new facility removes contaminants from the water supply through reverse osmosis.

Geography
According to the United States Census Bureau, the borough had a total area of 16.79 square miles (43.47 km2), including 1.07 square miles (2.78 km2) of land and 15.71 square miles (40.70 km2) of water (93.59%).

Unincorporated communities, localities and place names located partially or completely within the borough include Beacon Beach, Point Comfort and Tiltons Corner.

The borough has land borders with the Monmouth County municipalities of Hazlet Township, Middletown Township and Union Beach; and has maritime borders with Aberdeen Township and Keyport, and the New York City borough of Staten Island across Raritan Bay.

Demographics

Census 2010
   
The Census Bureau's 2006–2010 American Community Survey showed that (in 2010 inflation-adjusted dollars) median household income was $39,206 (with a margin of error of +/− $6,629) and the median family income was $52,128 (+/− $8,098). Males had a median income of $43,125 (+/− $8,899) versus $33,098 (+/− $4,163) for females. The per capita income for the borough was $21,246 (+/− $1,964). About 14.4% of families and 16.1% of the population were below the poverty line, including 21.3% of those under age 18 and 22.0% of those age 65 or over.

Census 2000
As of the 2000 United States census there were 10,732 people, 3,872 households, and 2,563 families residing in the borough. The population density was 9,954.4 people per square mile (3,836.7/km2). There were 4,269 housing units at an average density of 3,959.7 per square mile (1,526.2/km2). The racial makeup of the borough was 93.31% White, 2.13% African American, 0.10% Native American, 1.23% Asian, 0.07% Pacific Islander, 1.74% from other races, and 1.42% from two or more races. Hispanic or Latino of any race were 7.95% of the population.

There were 3,872 households, out of which 35.3% had children under the age of 18 living with them, 42.2% were married couples living together, 17.6% had a female householder with no husband present, and 33.8% were non-families. 27.4% of all households were made up of individuals, and 10.1% had someone living alone who was 65 years of age or older. The average household size was 2.71 and the average family size was 3.35.

In the borough the population was spread out, with 27.2% under the age of 18, 9.5% from 18 to 24, 31.2% from 25 to 44, 20.8% from 45 to 64, and 11.2% who were 65 years of age or older. The median age was 34 years. For every 100 females, there were 95.3 males. For every 100 females age 18 and over, there were 90.3 males.

The median income for a household in the borough was $36,383, and the median income for a family was $45,438. Males had a median income of $37,229 versus $28,398 for females. The per capita income for the borough was $17,417. About 15.5% of families and 17.7% of the population were below the poverty line, including 23.5% of those under age 18 and 18.4% of those age 65 or over.

Parks and recreation
 Keansburg Amusement Park
 Runaway Rapids Waterpark
 Henry Hudson Trail
 Raritan Bayshore Waterfront Park
 John Donohue III Park
 Keansburg Firemen's Memorial Park was established in May 1938
 Forest Park
 St. John's Park
 World War II Memorial Park
 Friendship Park
 James Sidoti Skate Park

Government

Local government
Keansburg operates within the Faulkner Act, formally known as the Optional Municipal Charter Law, under the Council-Manager form of municipal government. The borough is one of 42 municipalities (of the 564) statewide that use this form of government. Keansburg governing body is comprised of the five-member Borough Council, whose members are elected at-large in non-partisan voting as part of the May municipal election to four-year terms of office on a staggered basis, with either two or three seats coming up for election in even-numbered years. In March 1974, voters passed a referendum by 1,508 to 1,142 that expanded the council from three members to its current five. At a reorganization meeting after each election, the council selects a mayor and deputy mayor from among its members for a two-year term.

, members of the Keansburg Borough Council are Mayor George F. Hoff (term ends June 30, 2024), Deputy Mayor Thomas M. Foley (2024), James "Jim" Cocuzza Sr. (2022), Michael W. Donaldson (2022) and Sean D. Tonne (2024)

Federal, state and county representation
Keansburg is located in the 6th Congressional District and is part of New Jersey's 13th state legislative district.

 

Monmouth County is governed by a Board of County Commissioners comprised of five members who are elected at-large to serve three year terms of office on a staggered basis, with either one or two seats up for election each year as part of the November general election. At an annual reorganization meeting held in the beginning of January, the board selects one of its members to serve as Director and another as Deputy Director. , Monmouth County's Commissioners are
Commissioner Director Thomas A. Arnone (R, Neptune City, term as commissioner and as director ends December 31, 2022), 
Commissioner Deputy Director Susan M. Kiley (R, Hazlet Township, term as commissioner ends December 31, 2024; term as deputy commissioner director ends 2022),
Lillian G. Burry (R, Colts Neck Township, 2023),
Nick DiRocco (R, Wall Township, 2022), and 
Ross F. Licitra (R, Marlboro Township, 2023). 
Constitutional officers elected on a countywide basis are
County clerk Christine Giordano Hanlon (R, 2025; Ocean Township), 
Sheriff Shaun Golden (R, 2022; Howell Township) and 
Surrogate Rosemarie D. Peters (R, 2026; Middletown Township).

Politics
As of March 23, 2011, there were a total of 5,435 registered voters in Keansburg, of which 1,429 (26.3%) were registered as Democrats, 742 (13.7%) were registered as Republicans and 3,262 (60.0%) were registered as Unaffiliated. There were two voters registered as Libertarian or Green.

In the 2012 presidential election, Democrat Barack Obama received 59.4% of the vote (1,604 cast), ahead of Republican Mitt Romney with 39.1% (1,056 votes), and other candidates with 1.6% (42 votes), among the 2,733 ballots cast by the borough's 5,673 registered voters (31 ballots were spoiled), for a turnout of 48.2%. In the 2008 presidential election, Republican John McCain received 48.5% of the vote (1,782 cast), ahead of Democrat Barack Obama with 48.1% (1,769 votes) and other candidates with 1.4% (53 votes), among the 3,677 ballots cast by the borough's 6,248 registered voters, for a turnout of 58.9%. In the 2004 presidential election, Republican George W. Bush received 52.1% of the vote (1,995 ballots cast), outpolling Democrat John Kerry with 46.6% (1,783 votes) and other candidates with 0.5% (36 votes), among the 3,827 ballots cast by the borough's 6,588 registered voters, for a turnout percentage of 58.1.

In the 2013 gubernatorial election, Republican Chris Christie received 71.0% of the vote (1,106 cast), ahead of Democrat Barbara Buono with 27.3% (426 votes), and other candidates with 1.7% (26 votes), among the 1,592 ballots cast by the borough's 5,368 registered voters (34 ballots were spoiled), for a turnout of 29.7%. In the 2009 gubernatorial election, Republican Chris Christie received 59.3% of the vote (1,169 ballots cast), ahead of Democrat Jon Corzine with 32.6% (643 votes), Independent Chris Daggett with 6.0% (118 votes) and other candidates with 1.5% (30 votes), among the 1,970 ballots cast by the borough's 5,738 registered voters, yielding a 34.3% turnout.

Emergency services
The current Keansburg Police Department was created under an ordinance adopted in November 1926 which consisted of five members. The area known as Keansburg was under the authority of a Police Marshal prior to 1926. Before 1917, the area was patrolled by both Raritan Township (now Hazlet) and Middletown Township. The borough's first Police Marshal was James Gilligan, who was appointed in 1917 who served until his retirement in August 1943. The Chief of Police is Andrew Gogan.

Keansburg is served by two volunteer fire companies, Keansburg Fire Company No. 1 and New Point Comfort Fire Company No. 1.

Keansburg Fire Company #1, located on the corner of Main Street and Manning Place, was incorporated on October 13, 1912, making it the first fire company in the community.

New Point Comfort Volunteer Fire Company was organized in 1912 and incorporated on August 2, 1913 at the New Point Comfort Hotel located on Beachway Avenue. The company was first named the New Point Comfort Chemical Engine Company, and was later renamed the New Point Comfort Fire Company #1 in 1921. Having its first building on Oak Street, it later moved to a larger property at 192 Carr Avenue in 1959, where it is currently located.

The borough's two volunteer companies make up the Keansburg Fire Department, which was established in 1923. The chiefs of the two companies rotate as Chief and Assistant Chief of the Keansburg Fire Department. In even years the Chief of the Keansburg Fire Company #1 serves as Chief of the Keansburg Fire Department and the Chief of the New Point Comfort Volunteer Fire Company serving as Assistant Chief, while the roles are reversed in odd-numbered years.

In November 1998, the fire company established the Keansburg EMS and housed it on their property, where it is now a separate organization, responding to over 1,600 calls each year in only a one-square-mile area.

Education
Students in pre-kindergarten through twelfth grade are served by the Keansburg School District. The district is one of 31 former Abbott districts statewide that were established pursuant to the decision by the New Jersey Supreme Court in Abbott v. Burke which are now referred to as "SDA Districts" based on the requirement for the state to cover all costs for school building and renovation projects in these districts under the supervision of the New Jersey Schools Development Authority. As of the 2018–19 school year, the district, comprised of four schools, had an enrollment of 1,642 students and 185.0 classroom teachers (on an FTE basis), for a student–teacher ratio of 8.9:1. Schools in the district (with 2018–19 enrollment data from the National Center for Education Statistics) are:
Keansburg Preschool with 199 students in grade Pre-K, 
Joseph C. Caruso School with 668 students in grades K–4, 
Joseph R. Bolger Middle School with 348 students in grades 6–8 and 
Keansburg High School with 384 students in grades 9–12. At the start of the 2016–17 school year, the Port Monmouth Road School (which had 501 students in grades Pre-K–2) was closed with the opening of the new Joseph C. Caruso School for grades K–4. The  school was constructed at a cost of $51 million.

Transportation

Roads and highways

Route 36 runs along the borough's southern border. The Garden State Parkway is accessible via Route 36 in neighboring Hazlet.

Public transportation
NJ Transit offers local bus service on the 817 route.

Notable people

People who were born in, residents of, or otherwise closely associated with Keansburg include:
 Eugene J. Bedell (1928–2016), politician who served in the New Jersey General Assembly from 1972 to 1982
 James Coonan (born 1946), leader of the Irish gang known as the Westies
 Frank H. Field (1922–2013), chemist and mass spectrometrist known for his work in the development of chemical ionization
 James P. Maher (1865–1946), New York City Congressman from 1911 to 1921 who was elected Mayor of Keansburg in 1926
 Jason Mewes (born 1974), actor primarily known for his role as Jay, of the duo Jay and Silent Bob, in films directed by longtime friend, Kevin Smith
 John Montefusco (born 1950), ex-major league baseball player who played for the New York Yankees
 Donald Nash (1935–2016), criminal, who in 1982 committed two murders for hire and also killed three bystanders, and later killed a fellow prison inmate.
 Lou Taylor Pucci (born 1985), actor
 Horace M. Thorne (1918–1944), awarded the Medal of Honor for valor during World War II
 Roger "Hurricane" Wilson (born 1963), electric blues guitarist, singer and songwriter

References

External links

 Borough of Keansburg official website
 Keansburg School District
 Keansburg Historical Society

Sources
Gabrielan, Randall. Images of America: Keansburg, Arcadia Publishing, 1997. .

 
1917 establishments in New Jersey
Boroughs in Monmouth County, New Jersey
Faulkner Act (council–manager)
Populated places established in 1917
Raritan Bayshore